Parastenostola is a genus of longhorn beetles of the subfamily Lamiinae, containing the following species:

 Parastenostola brunnipes  (Gahan, 1888)
 Parastenostola nigroantennata Lin, Li & Yang, 2008

References

Saperdini